The oxidation of primary alcohols to carboxylic acids is an important oxidation reaction in organic chemistry.

When a primary alcohol is converted to a carboxylic acid, the terminal carbon atom increases its oxidation state by four. Oxidants able to perform this operation in complex organic molecules, featuring other oxidation-sensitive functional groups, must possess substantial selectivity. The most common oxidants are alkaline potassium permanganate (KMnO4) or acidified potassium dichromate. Jones reagent, PCC in DMF, Heyns oxidation, ruthenium tetroxide (RuO4) and TEMPO are also used.

Potassium permanganate

Potassium permanganate (KMnO4) is a very strong oxidant able to react with many functional groups, such as secondary alcohols, 1,2-diols, aldehydes, alkenes, oximes, sulfides and thiols. Under controlled conditions, KMnO4 oxidizes primary alcohols to carboxylic acids very efficiently. This reaction, which was first described in detail by Fournier, is typically carried out by adding KMnO4 to a solution or suspension of the alcohol in an alkaline aqueous solution. The resulting mixture is stirred until the oxidation is complete. For the reaction to proceed efficiently, the alcohol must be at least partially dissolved in the aqueous solution. This can be facilitated by the addition of an organic co-solvent such as dioxane, pyridine, acetone or t-BuOH. KMnO4 will readily react with a carbon-carbon double bond before oxidizing a primary alcohol.

Normally, these oxidations are performed under strong basic conditions, because this promotes a greater oxidation speed and selectivity. In substrates sensitive to strong base, the reaction can be carried out at a lower pH—or even under acidic conditions—at the cost of a greatly decreased reaction velocity.

KMnO4 is decomposed in water, resulting in formation of manganese dioxide (MnO2) and gaseous oxygen. This decomposition is catalyzed by acid, base and MnO2. As the extent of this decomposition is difficult to estimate during the oxidation of primary alcohols, the quantity of KMnO4 must be adjusted during the oxidation by adding it sequentially until the oxidation is complete.

Jones oxidation

The so-called Jones reagent is prepared by dissolving chromium trioxide (CrO3) in aqueous sulfuric acid, which results in formation of a reddish solution containing chromic acid (H2CrO4) and oligomers thereof. Addition of Jones reagent to a solution of a primary alcohol in acetone (as first described by Jones
) results in oxidation of the alcohol to a carboxylic acid. This classical protocol, involving a direct addition, is used very often regardless of the fact that it frequently leads to the formation of substantial amounts of esters (possessing the structure R-CO-O-CH2-R) derived from oxidative dimerization of primary alcohols. Holland and Gilman proved that this side reaction can be greatly suppressed by following the inverse addition protocol whereby a solution of the primary alcohol in acetone is slowly added to Jones reagent under conditions as dilute as practical.

Jones reagent interacts with secondary alcohols resulting in oxidation to ketones. Treatment of compounds, containing both primary and secondary alcohols, with Jones reagent leads to formation of ketoacids.

Problems encountered with the use of large quantities of chromium trioxide, which is toxic and dangerous for the environment, prompted the development by Zhao  of a catalytic procedure, involving treatment with excess of periodic acid (H5IO6) in presence of about 1.2 mol% of CrO3. Zhao's procedure for the use of catalytic CrO3 is very well-suited for reactions on a large scale.

PDC in DMF (Corey and Schmidt)

Pyridinium dichromate (PDC) is a bright-orange solid with the formulas (C5H5NH)2Cr2O7 that is very often used for the oxidation of primary and secondary alcohols to aldehydes and ketones respectively. On the other hand, in 1979, Corey and Schmidt reported  that reaction of saturated primary alcohols with PDC, using dimethylformamide (Me2NCHO, DMF) as solvent, results in oxidation to carboxylic acids rather than aldehydes. No oxidation to carboxylic acids occurs on allylic and benzylic primary alcohols. The procedure of Corey and Schmidt for the oxidation of saturated primary alcohols to carboxylic acids is run under essentially neutral conditions.

Heyns oxidation
In the heyns oxidation the oxidizing reagent is a combination of oxygen and platinum.

Ruthenium tetroxide

Ruthenium tetroxide has many uses in organic chemistry as an oxidizing agent. It is an aggressive agent allowing mild reaction conditions.

Two-step oxidation of alcohols to acids via isolated aldehydes

As a lot of the aforementioned conditions for the oxidations of primary alcohols to acids are harsh and not compatible with common protection groups, organic chemists often use a two-step procedure for the oxidation to acids. 
The primary alcohol is oxidized to an aldehyde using one of the many existing procedures (e.g. IBX oxidation, Dess–Martin periodinane). The aldehyde can then be subjected to the conditions of the Pinnick oxidation using sodium chlorite.
This sequence is often used in natural product synthesis, Nicolaou et al. applied it in their synthesis of Platencin.

References

Further reading
 

Organic oxidation reactions
Primary alcohols
Carboxylic acids